Isotoma may refer to:

 Isotoma (plant), a plant genus 
 Isotoma (springtail), a springtail genus